Pehle Aap is a Bollywood film. It was released in 1944.

Cast
Shamim as Shameem
Wasti	
Jeevan	
Dixit	Dixit		
Anwar Hussain
Vidya	
Laila	
Chandabai	
Amir Ali	as Amirali
Alauddin

The song "Hindustan Ke Hum Hain" is widely accepted as the first song sung by Mohd Rafi.

References

External links
 

1944 films
1940s Hindi-language films
Films directed by A. R. Kardar
Indian drama films
Indian black-and-white films
1944 drama films
Hindi-language drama films